Gilberto Andrés Romero Pino (born November 16, 1948 in Havana, Cuba), is a self-taught Cuban artist specializing in humorous drawings and paintings.

Career
He has participated in exhibitions such as the First through Sixth Bienal Internacional de Dibujo Humorístico y Gráfica Militante at the Círculo de Artesanos in San Antonio de los Baños, Havana. He was involved in the 7th and 9th International Cartoon Contest at Yomiuri Shimbum in Tokyo, Japan.

Awards
In 1983, he was awarded the Cuban Ministry of Culture's Award at the Third Humor Internacional Biennial at the Círculo de Artesanos at San Antonio de los Baños, Havana. In 1984, he won an award at the I Salón Provincial de Artes Plásticas "Eduardo Abela", at the Galería de Arte "Eduardo Abela" in Havana. He obtained an Honourable Mention Award at the 7th International Cartoon Contest at Yomiuri Shimbum in Tokyo, Japan. Two years later he obtained a trophy at the II Salón "Eduardo Abela" at the Galería de Arte Eduardo Abela, in San Antonio de los Baños, Havana.

Collections
His works can be found at Casa del Humor y la Sátira in Gabrovo, Bulgaria and at the Museo del Humor in San Antonio de los Baños, Havana.

References
 Viegas, Jose. Memoria: Artes Visuales Cubanas Del Siglo XX. California International Arts 2004.   
  Veigas-Zamora, Jose, Gutierrez, Cristina Vives, Nodal, Adolfo V., Garzon, Valia and de Oca, Dannys Montes. Memoria: Cuban Art of the 20th Century. California/International Arts Foundation 2001.

External links
 Cuban Centro de Informacion Para La Prensa

1948 births
Living people
People from Havana
Cuban contemporary artists